P. Balasubramanian was the Member of the Tamil Nadu Legislative Assembly for the Pattukkottai constituency from 1996 to 2001. He was a candidate for the Dravida Munnetra Kazhagam.

References

Year of birth missing (living people)
Living people
Dravida Munnetra Kazhagam politicians
Tamil Nadu MLAs 1996–2001
Place of birth missing (living people)